New Prospect may refer to:

McEntyre, Alabama, an unincorporated community also known as New Prospect
New Prospect, South Carolina, an unincorporated community
New Prospect, Wisconsin, an unincorporated community
New Prospect Church, a church in Virginia
New Prospect, Illinois, a fictional town, the setting of the 2021 novel Crossroads by Jonathan Franzen